CB Mass (Korean: CB 매스) was a Korean hip hop group composed of members Curbin, Choiza, and Gaeko. They debuted in 2000 with the album Massmediah. The group disbanded in 2003.

History
Choiza and Gaeko originally met in the sixth grade but before forming CB Mass they began an underground hip hop group named kod along with Sixpoint and ZASON, who joined in 1998. In the same year, Choiza and Gaeko met a fellow rapper Curbin and created CB Mass.

The group debuted in 2000 under Drunken Tiger's wing and released Massmediah to moderate success. In total they produced three albums: MassMediah in 2000, Massmatics in 2001, and Massappeal in 2003. They disbanded later the same year after a heated and public dispute where Curbin was accused of stealing money from the group. Their second album Massmatics was their most popular, with 120,000 copies sold in Korea.

At the height of their success however there were continuous rumours that they would break up and their last album added weight to this speculation with just Gaeko and Choiza appearing on most of the songs.  In the first song of Dynamic Duo's first album Gaeko raps "He liked standing in front of mirrors than music/ He worshipped cash more than friendship/ What he left with us is only betrayal," in a barely concealed reference to Curbin. After CB Mass broke up, Gaeko and Choiza formed Dynamic Duo while Curbin announced plans to go solo but has not yet released any material.

Collaborations
Like many hip hop groups CB Mass collaborated with many other Hip Hop groups and individuals.  In the song Jinja (진짜, meaning "real") they use the sample of Cheryl Lynn's disco classic Got to be Real for the instrumental. In this music video it features cameo appearances from members of The Movement, an alliance of Korean rappers, which was founded by Drunken Tiger, CB MASS, Uptown and Thanos. Other contributions on their albums include appearances by 서영은, Zason, 양키, P-Da (Tim), Bobby Kim, Juvie, 신지선, Dope Boyz, 윤미래, 에스더, DJ Wreckz, Mikieyes, Sean2slow, Insane Deegie, Yoon Mirae, Lee Tzsche, 이세진, dj honda, parrish PMD smith, headcrack, Yoo Jin Ah, Lee Ju Han, JK Kim Dong ook, Hey, Sin Ye Won, and Epik High.

CB Mass also featured on the first two songs of Lyn's 2002 album Have You Ever Had a broken Heart?.

Discography

Albums

Awards

References

South Korean hip hop groups